Nic is a gender-neutral given name, often short for Nicole, Nicholas, Nicola, or Dominic. It is also a component of Irish-language female surnames. It may refer to:

Arts and entertainment
 Nic Dalton (born 1964), Australian musician
 Nic Endo (born 1976), Japanese-German-American noise musician
 Nic Fiddian-Green (born 1963), British sculptor
 Nic Gotham (1959–2013), Canadian jazz musician
 Nic Harcourt (born 1957), English-American radio and TV presenter
 Nic Hill (born 1981), American film director
 Nic Jones (born 1947), English folk musician
 Nic Nac (born 1989), American record producer and rapper
 Nic Nassuet, American musician
 Nic Parry, Welsh TV presenter
 Nic Pizzolatto (born 1975), American writer and producer
 Nic Potter (1951–2013), British musician and painter
 Nic Robertson (born 1962), British CNN correspondent
 Nic Romm (born 1974), German actor
 Nic Sadler (born 1965), British cinematographer
 Nic Schiøll (1901–1984), Norwegian sculptor
 Nic Schröder (born 1980), Swedish actor and singer
 Nic Testoni (born 1972), Australian actor and presenter
 Nic Westaway (born 1989), Australian actor and singer

Politics
 Nic Curry, Canadian politician
 Nic Dakin (born 1955), British politician
 Nic Kipke (born 1979), American politician
 Nic Leblanc (born 1941), member of the Canadian House of Commons from 1984 to 2000
 Nic Lott (born 1979), American politician
 Nic Street (born 1979), Australian politician

Sports
Nic Strædet swimmer
 Nic Belasco (born 1973), Filipino-American basketball player
 Nic Beveridge (born 1987), Australian paratriathlete
 Nic Demski (born 1993), Canadian football player
 Nic Fink (born 1993), American swimmer
 Nic Fosdike (born 1980), Australian rules football player
 Nic Grigsby (born 1988), American-born Canadian football player
 Nic Grindrod (born 1975), English racing driver
 Nic Harris (born 1986), American football player
 Nic Jacobs (born 1991), American football player
 Nic Kerdiles (born 1994), American ice hockey player
 Nic Lentz (born 1989), American baseball umpire
 Nic Maddinson (born 1991), Australian cricketer
 Nic Moore (born 1992), American basketball player
 Nic Naitanui (born 1990), Australian rules football player
 Nic Newman (born 1993), Australian rules football player
 Nic O'Brien (born 1980), New Zealand hurdler
 Nic Pothas (born 1973), South African cricketer
 Nic Rausch (fl. 1924), Luxembourgian cyclist
 Nic Roeser (1896–1997), Luxembourgian gymnast
 Nic Roldan (born 1982), American polo player and model
 Nic Stene (1921–2006), Norwegian speed skater
 Nic Strange (born 1987), Welsh badminton player
 Nic Taylor (born 1991), English-Montserratian footballer
 Nic Wise (born 1987), American basketball player
 Nic Woods (born 1995), New Zealand field hockey player
 Nic Youngblud (born 1981), Canadian water polo player

Rugby union
 Nic Berry (born 1984), Australian rugby union player and referee
 Nic Cudd (born 1988), Welsh rugby union player
 Nic Fitisemanu (born 1978), New Zealand rugby union player
 Nic Groom (born 1990), South African rugby union player
 Nic Henderson (born 1981), Australian rugby union player
 Nic Johnson (born 1983), American rugby union player
 Nic Mayhew (born 1988), New Zealand rugby union player
 Nic Reynolds (born 1989), Welsh rugby union player
 Nic Rouse (born 1981), English rugby union player
 Nic Sestaret (born 1982), French rugby union player
 Nic Stirzaker (born 1991), Australian rugby union player
 Nic White (born 1990), Australian rugby union player

Others
 Nic Knudtzon (1922–2013), Norwegian telecommunications engineer
 Nic Radford (born 1977), American engineer
 Nic Read (born 1967), British researcher
 Nic Szeremeta (born 1943), English poker player
 Nic Waal (1905–1960), Norwegian psychiatrist

See also

Nick (disambiguation)
Nicotine, sometimes referred to as "nic"